Edward Angus Burt (April 9, 1859 – April 27, 1939) was an American mycologist and an authority on the resupinate (flat on the substrate) fungus family Thelephoraceae. He received his M.A. in 1894 and Ph.D. in 1895, both from Harvard University under William G. Farlow and Roland Thaxter. He became Professor of Natural History at Middlebury College in 1895, then both Professor of Botany at the Henry Shaw School of Botany at Washington University in St. Louis and mycologist for the Missouri Botanical Garden in 1913. He also worked on a systematic description of basidiomycetes such as Merulius and fungi from Vermont, Siberia, and Java.

The Septobasidium species S. burtii is named in his honor.

References

1859 births
1939 deaths
American mycologists
Harvard University alumni
Middlebury College faculty
Washington University in St. Louis faculty
People from Bradford County, Pennsylvania